Rio Branco Football Club, commonly referred to as Rio Branco, is a Brazilian professional club based in Rio Branco, Acre founded on 8 June 1919. It competes in the Campeonato Acreano, the top flight of the Acre state football league.

It is the most successful club in Acre, having won a record 47 state titles, 31 of those being won in the amateur era. Rio Branco also took part in the national league in 21 seasons, the most of any club from the state. It is also the first Northern Brazil and the only club from Acre to play in a continental cup, featuring in the 1997 Copa CONMEBOL after winning the Copa Norte in the same year. 

Rio Branco's highest national league finish was achieved in 1989, when they finished 16th in the Brazilian Série B. The club's home colours are red and white and the team mascot is the Altaneira star, a symbol from the Acre state flag.

Rio Branco is currently ranked third among Acre teams in CBF's national club ranking, at 98th place overall.

History
On June 8, 1919, the club was founded by the lawyer Luiz Mestrinho Filho, a relative of Governor Gilberto Mestrinho.

In 1947, the club won the first state championship organized by the Acre State Football Federation. From 1955 to 1957, Rio Branco won three state championships in a row.

Rio Branco won the first edition of Copa Norte in 1997, beating Remo of Pará state, in the final. Rio Branco gained the right to compete in that year's Copa CONMEBOL. The club was eliminated in the first round of Copa CONMEBOL, by Deportes Tolima, of Colombia, after losing in the penalty shootout. From 2002 to 2005, Rio Branco won four state championships in a row.

Season records

Stadium

Rio Branco currently plays in their home stadium, the Estádio José de Melo, which has a maximum capacity of 8,000 people.

The club also plays at Arena da Floresta, which has a maximum capacity of 20,000 people.

Colors
Rio Branco's official colors are red and white. Rio Branco's home kit is composed of a red shirt, red shorts and red socks.

Honours
 Copa Norte
 Winners (1): 1997

 Torneio de Integração da Amazônia
 Winners (3): 1976, 1979, 1984

 Campeonato Acreano
 Winners (48): 1919, 1921, 1928, 1929, 1935, 1936, 1937, 1938, 1939, 1940, 1941, 1943, 1944, 1945, 1946, 1947, 1950, 1951, 1955, 1956, 1957, 1960, 1961, 1962, 1964, 1971, 1973, 1977, 1979, 1983, 1986, 1992, 1994, 1997, 2000, 2002, 2003, 2004, 2005, 2007, 2008, 2010, 2011, 2012, 2014, 2015, 2018, 2021

References

External links
 Official website
 Arquivo de Clubes

 
Association football clubs established in 1919
Football clubs in Acre (state)
1919 establishments in Brazil
Rio Branco, Acre
Copa Norte winners